Only One Night is a 1950 West German drama film directed by Fritz Kirchhoff and starring Marianne Hoppe, Hans Söhnker and Willy Maertens. It was shot at the Tempelhof Studios in West Berlin. The film's sets were designed by the art director Ernst H. Albrecht. Location shooting took place on the Reeperbahn in Hamburg.

Synopsis
Two strangers enjoy a brief encounter after meeting in Hamburg.

Cast
 Marianne Hoppe as Die Frau
 Hans Söhnker as Der Mann
 Willy Maertens
 Lotte Klein
 Gustl Busch
 Inge Stoldt
 Reinhold Lütjohann
 Carl Voscherau
 Konrad Mayerhoff
 Otto Kuhlmann
 Erwin Linder
 Karl-Heinz Peters
 Arnim Dahl as Schläger auf der Reeperbahn
 Madelon Truß
 Lilo Müller
 Walter Scherau
 Lotte Manshardt
 Helmut Peine
 Horst von Otto
 Otto Graf
 Herbert A.E. Böhme
 Eva Probst
  Günter Pfitzmann

References

Bibliography 
 Hans-Michael Bock and Tim Bergfelder. The Concise Cinegraph: An Encyclopedia of German Cinema. Berghahn Books, 2009.

External links 
 

1950 films
1950 drama films
German drama films
West German films
1950s German-language films
Films directed by Fritz Kirchhoff
Films shot in Hamburg
Films set in Hamburg
German black-and-white films
1950s German films
Films shot at Tempelhof Studios